Victoria Viktorovna Slobodjanuk (born 30 November 1988) is a Russian female badminton player.

Achievements

BWF International Challenge/Series
Women's Singles

 BWF International Challenge tournament
 BWF International Series tournament
 BWF Future Series tournament

References

External links 

1988 births
Living people
Badminton players from Moscow
Russian female badminton players
21st-century Russian women